Meltdown is a live album by avant-rock, experimental power trio Massacre, featuring guitarist Fred Frith, bassist Bill Laswell and drummer Charles Hayward. It was recorded live at Robert Wyatt's 2001 Meltdown Festival in Queen Elizabeth Hall, London on June 17th, 2001.

Track listing
All tracks composed by Massacre except where stated.
"Up For It / Song For Che / Closing Circles and Loose End" (Massacre/Charlie Haden) – 20:37 	
"Hover" – 3:48 	
"For Food and Scatter" – 10:25 	
"Figure Out" – 25:23 	
"The Empire Strikes Back" – 2:06 	
"Over" – 5:14
Source: AllMusic, Discogs.

Personnel
Massacre
Fred Frith – guitar
Bill Laswell – bass guitars
Charles Hayward – drums, voice, melodica

Sound
Oz Fritz – engineer
Massacre – producer
Source: Discogs.

References

2001 live albums
Massacre (experimental band) albums
Tzadik Records live albums
Live free improvisation albums